USS Yacona may refer to one of these United States Navy ships:

 , a steel-hulled screw steam yacht built in 1898 at Kinghorn, Scotland.
 , laid down on 23 November 1944 at Bayonne, New Jersey.

United States Navy ship names